The UK Albums Chart (currently titled the Official Albums Chart) is a list of albums ranked by physical and digital sales and audio streaming in the United Kingdom. It was published for the first time on 22 July 1956 and is compiled every week by the Official Charts Company (OCC) on Fridays (previously Sundays). It is broadcast on BBC Radio 1 (top 5) and found on the OCC website as a Top 100 or on UKChartsPlus as a Top 200, with positions continuing until all sales have been tracked in data only available to industry insiders. However, even though number 100 was classed as a hit album (as in the case of The Guinness Book of British Hit Albums) in the 1980s until January 1989, since the compilations were removed this definition was changed to Top 75 with follow-up books such as The Virgin Book of British Hit Albums book only including this data. As of 2021, the OCC still only tracks how many UK Top 75s album hits and how many weeks in Top 75 albums chart each artist has achieved.

To qualify for the Official Albums Chart, the album must be the correct length and price. It must be more than three tracks or 20 minutes long and not be classed as a budget album. A budget album costs between £0.50 and £3.75. Full details of the rules can be found on the OCC website.

History

According to the canon of the OCC, the official British albums chart was the Record Mirror chart from 22 July 1956 to 1 November 1958; the Melody Maker chart from 8 November 1958 to March 1960;
the Record Retailer chart from 1960 to 1969; and the Official Albums Chart from 1969 on. For eight weeks in February and March 1971 no Official Albums Chart was compiled due to a postal strike – for this period, the OCC uses the chart compiled by Melody Maker instead.

In the 1970s the new album chart was revealed at 12:45 pm on Thursdays on BBC Radio 1, and then moved to 6:05 pm (later 6:30 pm) on Wednesday evenings during the Peter Powell and Bruno Brookes shows. In October 1987 it moved to Monday lunchtimes, during the Gary Davies show, and from April to October 1993 it briefly had its show from 7:00–8:00 pm on Sunday evenings, introduced by Lynn Parsons. Since October 1993 it has been included in The Official Chart show from 4:00 – 5:45 pm on Fridays (previously from 4:00 – 7:00 pm on Sundays). A weekly 'Album Chart' show was licensed out to BBC Radio 2 and presented by Simon Mayo, until it ended on 2 April 2007.

Though album sales tend to produce more revenue and, over time, act as a greater measure of an artist's success, this chart receives less media attention than the UK Singles Chart, because overall sales of an album are more important than its peak position. 2005 saw a record number of artist album sales with 126.2  million sold in the UK. In February 2015, it was announced that due to the falling sales of albums and rise in popularity of audio streaming, the Official Albums Chart would begin including streaming data from March 2015. Under the revised methodology, the Official Charts Company takes the 12 most streamed tracks from one album, with the top-two songs being down-weighted in line with the average of the rest. The total of these streams is divided by 1000 and added to the pure sales of the album. This calculation was designed to ensure that the chart rundown continues to reflect the popularity of the albums themselves, rather than just the performance of one or two smash hit singles. The final number one album on the UK Albums Chart to be based purely on sales alone was Smoke + Mirrors by Imagine Dragons. On 1 March 2015, In the Lonely Hour by Sam Smith became the first album to top the new streaming-incorporated Official Albums Chart.

The weekly Top 75 UK Albums Chart (albums described as hits in the case of British Hit Singles & Albums or The Virgin Book of British Hit Albums) were published in Music Week magazine until 2021. In 2018 Future (publisher of 'Louder Sound' publications such as Metal Hammer and Classic Rock) acquired Music Week publisher NewBay Media. Future decided that the publication would go monthly from March 2021, and so a bespoke monthly Official Albums Chart Top 75 (similar to album charts used by Top of the Pops in the early 1990s  and Absolute 80s on Sundays) started to be published from this date alongside monthly singles charts and specialist/genre charts.

By 2022, the weekly album chart had started to regularly feature a pattern of acts getting a Top 10 new entry one week, followed by a dramatic decline the next, with most of these releases exiting the Top 75 completely. The majority of these acts would be indie and rock bands like The Wombats, Sea Power and Maximo Park, who would market their album to the type of people who would want to own the release via a physical format rather than streaming it. This trend became so prevalent that Northern Irish indie band Two Door Cinema Club decided to take a stand and ended up destroying the masters of their latest album Keep On Smiling, so it would not become part of a multi-formatted first week marketing opportunity.

The first number one on the UK Albums Chart was Songs for Swingin' Lovers! by Frank Sinatra for the week ending 22 July 1956. As of the week ending 23 March 2023, the UK Albums Chart has had 1311 different number one albums. The current number one album is Endless Summer Vacation by Miley Cyrus.

Record holders

The most successful artists in the charts depend on the criteria used. As of February 2016, Queen albums have spent more time on the British album charts than any other musical act, followed by the Beatles, Elvis Presley, U2 and ABBA. By most weeks at number one, the Beatles lead with a total of 176 weeks, and the most number one albums of all with 15, followed by The Rolling Stones with 13 number ones. Similar to the situation regarding Elvis Presley's record breaking tally of number ones on the singles chart, The Official Charts Company has classed re-issues of Exile on Main Street and Goats Head Soup, as brand new hits/number 1s due to the amount of bonus material available, formats released and the fact that the issuing record label had changed.

As of September 2022, Elvis Presley is still the male solo artist with the most weeks at number one with a total of 66 weeks and most top ten albums by any artist, charting 53 releases. Until this month, he also held the record for the most number one albums by a solo artist in a tie with Robbie Williams, however when William's XXV album reached the top on 16 September 2022, the former Take That star broke this record with 14 number ones albums to Presley's 13 chart toppers, with Williams moving into second place in the all-time number 1 album record holders with William's number of chart topping albums behind one behind The Beatles. With Williams and Presley, the record was broken on a technicality, as many of Elvis's albums have been kept off the top spot by movie soundtracks, while with Williams such albums are now in their own chart.  Madonna has the most number one albums (12) by a female artist in the UK, though this includes the Evita film soundtrack which was a cast recording and not strictly a Madonna album. However, even if Evita is excluded in her tally, at 11 albums she would still be the female act with most UK No. 1 albums. Eminem holds the record for the most consecutive number one albums in Official Albums Chart history, with ten consecutive UK number one albums. Adele is the female solo artist with the most weeks at number one, with a total of 37 weeks.  Spice Girls are the female group with the most weeks at number one, with a total of 18 weeks for Spice (15 weeks).

In March 2018, Little Mix fourth studio album Glory Days, set a new chart record for the most weeks spent inside the top 40 of the UK Albums Chart for a girl group album. As of 2022, it has spent 89 weeks on the charts. In June 2019, after the release of their fifth studio album LM5, they became the first female group to have five Top 5 studio albums.

In July 2021, ABBA's Gold: Greatest Hits was officially recognised by the Official Charts Company as the first album to spend over 1000 weeks on the Albums Chart, but this total does not include 2014's Gold – 40th Anniversary Edition (which like Queen's The Platinum Collection is a 3-CD set also including More ABBA Gold: More ABBA Hits and The Golden B-sides) or additional weeks inside the Top 100 missing from the OCC's database before February 1994 (as with the singles chart, Music Week only published the Top 75 as this was the public chart for store owners to use in their record shops with the Top 150 Artist Albums Chart  being for industry insiders/ChartsPlus subscribers).

For many years, The Beatles' Sgt. Pepper's Lonely Hearts Club Band was the best-selling album in UK chart history, but is now in third-place after being supplanted by Queen and then by ABBA's Gold: Greatest Hits, however, Sgt. Pepper still remains the best-selling studio album in UK chart history. Both albums have sold in excess of 5.1 million copies. The longest-running number one album, both consecutively and non-consecutively, is the soundtrack of the film South Pacific. It had a consecutive run of 70 weeks from November 1958 to March 1960, and had further runs at the top in 1960 and 1961, making a non-consecutive total of 115 weeks.

The youngest artist to top the chart is Neil Reid, whose debut album topped the chart in 1972 when he was only 12 years old, while the youngest female artist is Billie Eilish who was 17 years old when she debuted at the top with When We All Fall Asleep, Where Do We Go?. The record for the oldest artist to top the charts goes to Vera Lynn, who was 92 years old when she was at number one with We'll Meet Again: The Very Best of Vera Lynn, released in 2009 (though the album only contains material she recorded between 1936 and 1959). Lynn, who died in 2020 at the age of 103, also leads the list for the oldest artist to have a chart album, when the 2017 release of Vera Lynn 100, released to mark her 100th birthday (though again, this only contains material she recorded decades earlier), peaked at number 3. Currently, the oldest living male artist to have the topped the UK albums chart is Tom Jones, who reached the top in 2021 with new studio album Surrounded By Time at the age of 80, while  95 year old Tony Bennett charted at number 6 on the chart of 8–14 October 2021 with his Lady Gaga duets album Love For Sale, becoming recognised by Guinness World Records as the oldest person to release an album of new material.
 
In 1980, Kate Bush became the first British female artist to have a number-one album in the UK with Never for Ever, as well as being the first album by any female solo artist to enter the chart at number 1. In August 2014 she became the first female artist to have eight albums in the Official UK Top 40 Albums Chart simultaneously, (altogether she had eleven albums in the Top 50 in one week). She is currently in fourth place for artists having the most simultaneous UK Top 40 albums, behind Elvis Presley and David Bowie who both tie for the most simultaneous Top 40 albums (twelve each, both immediately following their deaths in 1977 and 2016 respectively), and The Beatles who had eleven in 2009 when remastered versions of their albums were released.

The fastest selling album (first chart week sales) is 25 by Adele. Released in November 2015, it sold over 800,000 copies in its first week. However, the album Be Here Now by Oasis is a controversial second place, this is due to the fact its release date was irregular, being released on a Thursday instead of the usual Monday. The record was released on 21 August 1997 and sold around 813,000 in its first week which surpasses the current claimant to the title, though this topic is still highly contested.

The Rolling Stones are the first act to have reached number one in the album chart during six different decades (1960s, 1970s, 1980s, 1990s, 2010s and 2020s) though their number one in the 2020s was the reissue of Goats Head Soup. For solo artists, Elvis Presley was the first artist to score UK number-one albums in five different decades (the 1950s, 1960s, 1970s, 2000s and 2010s). In 2020, Bruce Springsteen became the first solo artist to score UK number-one albums in five consecutive decades (the 1980s, 1990s, 2000s, 2010s, and 2020s) with his twelfth number-one album Letter to You. Also in 2020, Kylie Minogue became the first female solo artist to have UK number-one albums in five different decades (which also happened to be consecutively, the 1980s, 1990s, 2000s, 2010s, and 2020s), with her eighth UK number-one album Disco. In 2021 ABBA became the second group to score a UK number 1 album in five different decades (1970s, 1980s, 1990s, 2000s, and 2020s) with the band's tenth number 1 album, Voyage. With that album ABBA also became the artist with the longest gap between number 1 studio albums, 40 years.

The longest number one by a group is Simon and Garfunkel's Bridge Over Troubled Water which was number one for 33 weeks (13 of which were consecutive). The longest consecutive number one by a group was the Beatles' Please Please Me, which held the top spot for a straight 30 weeks. The longest number one by a male solo artist was Elvis Presley with G.I. Blues which stayed at the top for 22 weeks (his Blue Hawaii album was also the longest consecutive number one album for a male artist with 17 weeks). Adele's album 21 has the most weeks at number one by a female solo artist (and by a solo artist of any gender) with 23 weeks, 11 of which were consecutive (which is also a record for a female artist).

The first studio album and non-soundtrack or cast recording album to top the year-end chart was With the Beatles by The Beatles in 1963 – they became the first group to achieve this feat. Elton John's Don't Shoot Me I'm Only the Piano Player in 1973, marks the first album by a male artist and solo act to do so. The first female solo artist to have the UK's year-end best seller was Barbra Streisand in 1982, with Love Songs.

The first studio album and non-soundtrack or cast recording album to top the decade-end chart was Sgt. Pepper's Lonely Hearts Club Band by The Beatles in the 1960s – they became the first group to achieve this. James Blunt's Back to Bedlam, in the 2000s, marks the first album by a male artist and solo act to do it. Blunt was the only performer in history to top the decade chart with a debut album. The first female solo artist to achieve this feat was Adele in the 2010s, with 21.

Dua Lipa's Future Nostalgia holds the record for having the lowest one-week sales while at the top of the chart in the modern era, when it was number one the week beginning 15 May 2020 with sales of only 7,317, while in 2021 You Me At Six (Suckapunch) and Ben Howard (Collections from the Whiteout) became the first artists to have a number one album exit the Top 100 with only one week on the chart (though when The Guinness Book of British Hit Albums did their list of number one albums with the fewest weeks on the chart, it was based on the Top 75 countdown and featured acts such as Little Angels with their 1993 album Jam). In 2022, Fix Yourself, Not The World by The Wombats also exited the Top 75 after debuting the previous week at number one (though in this case its second week sales of 1,453 made it have a position within the public Top 100 at number 96).

In regards to other albums exiting the Top 75 or Top 100 from number one, the biggest ever fall from the top occurred in the first week of 2021 when Christmas by Michael Buble ended up at number 406 with a sales total of 468 albums, while in 2022, Amazing Things by Don Broco re-entered the Top 100 for a second week as the 1266th number one album and then dropped to number 139 a week later (with a sales total of 1,128) giving the act the second biggest fall from the top.

On 26 August 2022, Aitch became the first artist to chart with an album released in a NFT format when Close to Home debuted at number 2 (with Steps beating the rapper to number one and becoming the first mixed-gender British act to get chart topping albums in four consecutive decades). A week later, 
Will of the People by Muse became the first NFT-listed album to top the charts, with the limited edition NFT listed as part of the 3,889 downloaded copies it sold out of 51,510 sales. In addition to this achievement, Muse also became the first band to debut at the top with seven consecutive studio album releases, with their seven number ones now being the same amount as Elton John, Paul McCartney, George Michael, The Killers and The Prodigy. Nevertheless, the first NFT approved album by the OCC was How Will I Know If Heaven Will Find Me? by The Amazons, which ended up charting at number 5 on 16 September 2022, a few weeks after Muse came out, with both bands having their NFT sales tracked by the OCC, unlike Aitch four weeks earlier.

Also on 16 September 2022, Columbia became the first record label to take the Top 3 chart positions with three different acts with releases by Robbie Williams, Ozzy Osbourne and Harry Styles occupying number 1, 2 and 3 (with parent company Sony Music also having the number 4 with a re-issue of Manic Street Preachers' Know Your Enemy). In the previous 66 years of the chart, this occurrence where one label has had the Top 3 has only happened twice before with Parlophone taking the Top 3 positions in 1964 with two albums by The Beatles and Stay With The Hollies and K-Tel having three TV-advertised compilations at number 1, 2 and 3 on the chart of 31 December 1972.

On 31 May, 2018, BTS became the first K-pop artist to reach the top 10 of the chart with their third Korean-language studio album Love Yourself: Tear, and subsequently also became the first to reach number one with their sixth extended play, Map of the Soul: Persona. On 23 September, 2022, Blackpink became the first female K-pop group to achieve a number-one album on the chart, with their second studio album Born Pink.

Debut albums
The fastest-selling debut albums (first-week sales):
 All-time highest sales by a solo female artist is Susan Boyle with I Dreamed a Dream, which sold 411,820 copies in November 2009.
 By a band is Arctic Monkeys with Whatever People Say I Am, That's What I'm Not, which sold 363,735 copies in 2006.
 By a solo male act is Craig David with Born to Do It, which sold 225,320 copies in 2000.

Sam Smith holds the record for most weeks spent in the Top 10 by a debut album with In the Lonely Hour, with 76, surpassing a record previously held by Emeli Sandé.

Official Compilations Chart Top 100
Over more than sixty years of compiling album sales, the various chart compiling firms have had a problem with the success of multi-artist compilation albums, with these albums (mostly TV-advertised collections featuring a number of hits) either being allowed to chart in the main album chart or excluded.

In August 1971, the British Market Research Bureau (BMRB) allowed low-priced budget albums to chart as well as standard compilations. This decision gave a number one to Music For Pleasure's Hot Hits 6, which went straight in at the top of the chart and was joined at number 6 by a new entry for Hallmark's Top of the Pops Volume 18, another album featuring a selection of popular tracks performed by session artists in the style of a recent hit (and unconnected with the BBC series of Top of the Pops albums, which would follow in the 1990s).

This decision was soon overturned, with these anonymous cover albums being taken out the chart again. On the Official Albums Chart Top 50 for the week ending 18 August 1973, all the compilations listed as 'various artists' albums were taken out of the chart, but those billed as 'official soundtracks' (to films such as A Clockwork Orange and Cabaret) were kept in. As the Ronco-released tie-in to the 1973 film That'll Be the Day was listed as a various artist album and not as a soundtrack, it disappeared from the chart after its seventh week at number one alongside EMI's former number one Pure Gold and Phillip's 20 Original Chart Hits.

In 1983, the Now That's What I Call Music series was launched by EMI/Virgin, followed by CBS/WEA's rival Hits Album series a year later and Chrysalis/MCA's Out Now! in 1985. From this point in the 1980s, every regular edition of Now That's What I Call Music topped the albums chart (apart from Now 4 which was kept of the number one spot by the first ever Hits Album), with these albums from the three major-label joint-ventures joined in the charts by many albums from all the regular compilation specialists like K-Tel, Telstar and Stylus. As the amount of compilations in the chart were keeping out artists from reaching number one or charting at all, it was decided that all the various artist albums would be removed from the Official Albums Chart Top 100.

In January 1989, all the various artist compilation albums were removed from the Top 100 albums chart and given their own Top 20 chart (found in Music Week and Record Mirror), with the main albums chart reformatted as a top 75 (as far as hit albums are concerned) to equal the singles chart.

As of 2022, the OCC publishes the Official Compilations Chart Top 100 on their website, which as well as listing the chart places of all the various Now That's What I Call Music!, Hits Albums and Ministry of Sound Annuals that have been released, now include Motion Picture Cast Recordings such as The Greatest Showman or A Star Is Born and Original Broadway/West End cast albums such as Hamilton, all three of which were included in the main artist albums chart before 2020. In addition to the main Compilations chart, all the 'Motion Picture Cast Recordings' and cast albums get their own Official Soundtrack Albums Chart Top 50, but are still classed as artist albums as far as the singles chart is concerned with, for example, only three tracks from early 2022 chart topper Encanto (a Disney soundtrack which sold 13,855 units to be at number one for the chart of 3 February 2022) being allowed to chart as singles at a time.

Albums with the most weeks at Number 1 on the UK Albums Chart

Notes

See also
UK Singles Chart
List of UK Albums Chart Christmas number ones
List of UK Albums Chart number ones
List of artists by number of UK Albums Chart number ones
List of artists who have spent the most weeks on the UK music charts
List of best-selling albums by year in the United Kingdom
List of albums which have spent the most weeks on the UK Albums Chart
List of singles which have spent the most weeks on the UK Singles Chart
Lists of fastest-selling UK debuts albums

References

External links
  Top 100
 Music Week  Top 75
 EveryHit.com – Archive of Top 40 albums
 

British record charts
1956 establishments in the United Kingdom
BBC Radio 1